Ryu Gwang-ho (born 21 July 1970) is a North Korean ice dancer. She competed in the ice dance event at the 1992 Winter Olympics.

References

1970 births
Living people
North Korean female ice dancers
Olympic figure skaters of North Korea
Figure skaters at the 1992 Winter Olympics
Place of birth missing (living people)